Shanghai Mint refers to:

 Central Mint, originally named "Shanghai Mint", in Taiwan.
 Shanghai Mint, in Shanghai, People's Republic of China.